For the succeeding university, please see University of Chinese Academy of Social Sciences

The Graduate School of Chinese Academy of Social Sciences (GSCASS) is a public graduate school in Beijing, and one of the first two graduate schools (with Graduate University of the Chinese Academy of Sciences) established in the People’s Republic of China. 

The descendent of GUCASS is the University of Chinese Academy of Social Sciences (UCASS), which was set up as one of the forerunners as a public university for graduate education in humanities and social sciences in China.

History
Founded in 1978, the Graduate School of Chinese Academy of Social Sciences was approved by the top leaders of the People's Republic of China in the form of an Executive Order. Different from other graduate schools run by university or college, the Graduate School of Chinese Academy of Social Sciences functions under the authority of China's main organ of research in the social sciences — the Chinese Academy of Social Sciences (CASS) — one of the largest state-run research organizations that provide policy-making suggestions in social, national and international domains.

Originally, the purpose of GSCASS was to construct a Prospect Research Faculty Incubator, in order to provide qualified first-class research candidates to aid the Chinese Academy of Social Sciences. Over time, the Graduate School has emerged as a general institution for higher learning. A high percentage of GSCASS graduates enter the Legislative, Executive and Judicial branches of Chinese government and research organizations. As such, it plays a leading role in academic research, policy-making, and social movement. The establishment of GSCASS made a huge impact on Chinese education and training in the humanities and social sciences, at the dawn of the Reform and Opening Up (also known as the Economic reform in the People's Republic of China).

List of presidents
Zhou Yang (周扬) 1978-1982
Wen Jize (温济泽) 1982-1985
Hu Sheng (胡绳) 1985-1990
Jiang Liu (江流) 1990-1991
Pu Shan (浦山) 1991-1994
Fang Keli (方克立) 1994-2000
Li Tieying (李铁映) 2000-2002
Wu Yin (武寅) 2002-2007
Liu Yingqiu (刘迎秋) 2007–present

Academic organizations

GSCASS was born to be prestigious because of the outstanding academic resources the CASS has selected and collected from nationwide. It has so far grown up with the widest coverage in research and education spanning humanity and social science areas and has defined its leading momentum among all graduate schools in China. By now, the GSCASS was authorized to confer Doctoral and Master research degree in 11 disciplines, 167 sub-disciplines of humanity and social science. Original and independent research is a hallmark of GSCASS.

GSCASS is composed of Faculty Committee, Academic Council, Academic Degree Evaluation Committee, six Departments, 38 Schools and over 900 faculty members. Typically, a faculty member has at most one student to advise in three years. This one-to-one system between teacher and student encourages graduate students to be involved in important research programs — usually waged by public. Students are free to embrace more significant experiences combining the theoretical and practical, as well as deeper emotional communication under such an arrangement.

In international communication, the GSCASS has established strong academic exchange programs with prestigious graduate schools around the world. Overseas programs for non-Chinese speaking students began running in 1985. The number of degree students from Hong Kong, Macao and Taiwan kept surging from its first opening in 2000.

Compared with other famous graduate schools run by universities, the scale of GSCASS graduates has been very small. Up to June 2008, the Academic Degree Evaluation Committee of GSCASS had conferred 2,574 doctoral degrees, 4,198 master's degrees and 339 professional master's degrees. In recent years, The GSCASS enrolls about 260 Doctoral candidates and 182 Master candidates annually. Students from the mainland of China qualified for application are required to obtain outstanding scores in National Master Entrance Examination or Doctoral Entrance Examination the school holds annually. So far, all GSCASS Master's degree candidates are fully financial aided. Ph.D. candidates, due to the latest policy, however, were covered by fund support in a fixed percentage to encourage top students to compete extra financial aid by outstanding performance in academic research.

Campus life

The campus was in Wangjing area, northeast of the Beijing city, adjacent to Central Academy of Fine Arts, Beijing Youth Politics College and China Medical University. Small in scale, it was well integrated and fully equipped, exuding a kind of 1980s’ spirit and confidence which is rare today.

By the end of 2009, the new advanced campus site in the Beijing Liangxiang University Park of Higher Education was to come into service. The former campus site functions as an auxiliary facility till then.

Notable faculty

Committee members and senior professors of DPSS, CAS (1955)

Yu Guangyuan (于光远), Economics, Sociology, and Philosophy
Ji Xianlin (季羡林), Indology (Sanskrit, Pali, Tocharian)
Chen Hansheng (陈翰笙), History of Asia
Liu Danian (刘大年), Modern History of China
Lü Shuxiang (吕叔湘), Chinese Grammar Studies
Luo Gengmo (骆耕漠), Economics
Qian Junrui (钱俊瑞), Rural Economics
Xia Nai (夏鼐), Archeology and Field Excavation
Xu Dixin (许涤新), Economics
Feng Zhi (冯至), Chinese Classical Literature and German Philosophy
He Lin (贺麟), Philosophy
Yin Da (尹达), NeolithicArcheology
Zhang Youyu (张友渔), Law

Committee members emeritus, CASS (2006)

Yu Zuyao (于祖尧)

Qiu Shihua (仇士华)

Kong Fan (孔繁)

Wang Zhongshu (王仲殊)

Wang Qingcheng (王庆成)

Wang Guichen (王贵宸)

Wang Gengjin (王耕今)

Deng Shaoji (邓绍基)

Liu Shide (刘世德)

Liu Keming (刘克明)

Liu Nanlai (刘楠来)

Liu Kuili (刘魁立)

Lu Daji (吕大吉)

Zhu Zhai (朱寨)

Zhu Shaowen (朱绍文)

He Zhenyi (何振一)

Yu Shengwu (余绳武)

Yu Dunkang (余敦康)

Tong Zhuchen (佟柱臣)

Wu Yuanmai (吴元迈)

Wu Chengming (吴承明)

Wu Jiajun (吴家骏)

Zhang Jiong (张炯)

Zhang Changshou (张长寿)

Zhang Shouyi (张守一)

Zhang Zexian (张泽咸)

Zhang Chunnian (张椿年)

Li Cong (李琮)

Li Daokui (李道揆)

Li Buyun (李步云)

Du Jiwen (杜继文)

Yang Tianshi (杨天石)

Yang Zengwen (杨曾文)

 (汪海波)

Wang Jingyu (汪敬虞)

Gu Yuanyang (谷源洋)

Chen Shen (陈燊)

Chen Dongsheng (陈栋生)

Chen Zhihua (陈之骅)

Chen Leming (陈乐民)

Chen Qineng (陈启能)

Chen Yunquan (陈筠泉)

Chen Yupi (陈毓罴)

Jin Yijiu (金宜久)

Zhao Renwei (赵人伟)

Zhao Fengqi (赵凤岐)

Luo Gengmo (洛耕漠)

Xu Pingfang (徐苹芳)

Xu Chongwen (徐崇温)

Tu Jiliang (涂纪亮)

Zi Zhongyun (资中筠)

Guo Songyi (郭松义)

Qian Zhongwen (钱中文)

Gao Dichen (高涤陈)

Liang Cunxiu (梁存秀)

Huang Xinchuan (黄心川)

Huang Shaoxiang (黄绍湘)

Dong Hengxun (董衡巽)

Dao Bu (道布)

Han Yanlong (韩延龙)

Cai Meibiao (蔡美彪)

Dai Yuanchen (戴园晨)

Qu Tongzu (瞿同祖)

Committee members, CASS (2006)

Fang Keli (方克立)

Wang Shuwen (王叔文)

Wang Jiafu (王家福)

Shi Jinbo (史金波)

Ye Xiushan (叶秀山)

Tian Xueyuan (田雪原)

Liu Qingzhu (刘庆柱)

Liu Guoguang (刘国光)

Liu Shucheng (刘树成)

Lu Zheng (吕政)

Ru Xin (汝信)

Jiang Lansheng (江蓝生)

Yu Yongding (余永定)

Leng Rong (冷溶)

Zhang Zhuoyuan (张卓远)

Zhang Xiaoshan (张晓山)

Zhang Haipeng (张海鹏)

Zhang Yunling (张蕴岭)

Li Yang (李扬)

Li Jingwen (李京文)

Li Chongfu (李崇富)

Li Jingyuan (李景源)

Li Jingjie (李静杰)

 (杨义)

Yang Shengming (杨圣明)

Wang Tongsan (汪同三)

Shen Jiaxuan (沈家煊)

Su Zhenxing (苏振兴)

Chen Jiagui (陈佳贵)

Chen Zuwu (陈祖武)

Chen Gaohua (陈高华)

Zhuo Xinping (卓新平)

Zhou Hong (周弘)

Zhou Shulian (周叔莲)

Lin Ganquan (林甘泉)

Zheng Chengsi (郑成思)

Hao Shiyuan (郝时远)

Geng Yunzhi (耿云志)

Liang Huixing (梁慧星)

Huang Baosheng (黄宝生)

Jing Tiankui (景天魁)

Qiu Yuanlun (裘元伦)

Jin Huiming (靳辉明)

Liao Xuesheng (廖学盛)

Notable alumni

Party and state leaders
Bo Xilai (薄熙来)
Chen Yuan (陈元)

Governors and state officials

Liu Binjie (柳斌杰)
Wang Chen (王晨)
Zhu Weiqun (朱维群)
Li Zhanshu (栗战书)
Yang Jing (杨晶)
Yang Chuantang (杨传堂)
Xin Chunying (信春鹰)
He Jiacheng (何家成)
Ye Xiaowen (叶小文)
Huang Xiaoxiang (黄小祥)
Li Jiheng (李纪恒)
Jiang Zelin (江泽林)
Yang Xiong (杨雄)
Ma Jiantang (马建堂)
Wu Lan (乌兰)
Han Zhiran (韩志然)
Xing Yun (邢云)
Jin Daoming (金道铭)

Scholars

Shen Jiaxuan (沈家煊)
Xiaokai Yang (杨小凯)
Fan Gang (樊纲)
Gu Hailiang (顾海良)
Wang Chaohua (王超华)

Writers
Xu Kun (徐坤)
Jiang Rong (姜戎)
Zhang Chengzhi (张承志)

Entrepreneurs

Kong Dan (孔丹)

Events
August 21, 1978: Top leaders of the Central Government of China, Ye Jianying, Deng Xiaoping, Wu Lanfu and Wang Dongxing, etc. signed the bill of The Graduate School of Chinese Academy of Social Sciences into executive order. The first humanity and social science graduate school of China was thence established.
Sept. 21st, 1981- the 1st Commencement of the Graduate School of Chinese Academy of Social Sciences was held at the National Museum of Chinese History.
July 17, 1982: The 1st Degree Conferring Ceremony of the Graduate School of Chinese Academy of Social Sciences was held at the Great Hall of the People.
August 15, 1984: Construction of Chaoyang campus (the campus currently in use) broke earth.
October 8, 1988: The Ten Year Anniversary of the Graduate School of Chinese Academy of Social Sciences was held at the Hall of Chinese People's Political Consultative Conference.
1989: The Political Unrest of 1989 in Beijing made great impact to the Graduate School of Chinese Academy of Social Sciences. The GSCASS was suspended from enrolling for three years which resulted in a roughly nine-year depression to the school.
Sept. 1st, 1998: General Sectary, President Jiang Zemin addressed to the Twenty Year Anniversary of the Graduate School of Chinese Academy of Social Sciences, “To Build the Graduate School of Chinese Academy of Social Sciences a Prominent Incubator for Talents of Humanity and Social Sciences.”
Sept. 25, 1998: The Twenty Year Anniversary of the Graduate School of Chinese Academy of Social Sciences was held at the Great Hall of the People.
July 6, 2000: The 1st Commencement for International Students of the Graduate School of Chinese Academy of Social Sciences.
April 26, 2005: The 1st Opening Ceremony for MPA Graduate Students.
April 26, 2008: New campus site in Beijing Liangxiang University Park (University) of Higher Education broke earth.
Sept. 27, 2008: The Thirty Year Anniversary of the Graduate School of Chinese Academy of Social Sciences.

References

External links

University of Chinese Academy of Social Sciences

Universities and colleges in Beijing
Educational institutions established in 1978
1978 establishments in China